Sherman Building is a historic commercial building located at Sullivan, Sullivan County, Indiana. It was built between 1926 and 1915, and is a three-story, rectangular, brick building with terra cotta trim. The building housed the Sherman Theater on the first and second floors and offices on the third floor.

It was listed on the National Register of Historic Places in 1986.

References

External links
Cinema Treasures: Sherman Theatre

Commercial buildings on the National Register of Historic Places in Indiana
Commercial buildings completed in 1915
Buildings and structures in Sullivan County, Indiana
National Register of Historic Places in Sullivan County, Indiana